Pleurobranchida is an order of gastropods belonging to the class Gastropoda.

Families:
 Pleurobranchaeidae 
 Pleurobranchidae 
 Quijotidae

References

Gastropods